Ethan Allen is a Grammy nominated American record producer, composer, and mixer currently living in Los Angeles, California. He is also a multi-instrumentalist and performer currently working with the band ASHRR. Some of his credits include Mavis Staples, Black Rebel Motorcycle Club, Ben Harper, The 88, Tricky, Luscious Jackson, The Cult, Gram Rabbit, Sheryl Crow, Tim Finn, Brant Bjork, Donita Sparks, Meg Myers, Patty Griffin, and Better Than Ezra.

History
Ethan began his musical career playing in bands and writing songs in Austin, Texas. It was also there that he began learning to record, working first at a small jingle studio, and later at Arlyn and Pedernales, Willie Nelson's two studios and at the time the largest studios in town.
In 1995, Ethan accepted an invitation to come and work at Kingsway, producer Daniel Lanois' recording studio located in the French Quarter of New Orleans. While there, he eventually became house engineer and worked on many major label and independent records with a wide variety of artists, producers, engineers, and musical styles.
Ethan left that position in 2000 to become a freelance engineer and producer, and also helped to found the Truck Farm Studio in the upper ninth ward of New Orleans.
Since 2003, Ethan has been a resident of the Silverlake neighborhood of Los Angeles, and it is also the location of his studio – Royal Triton.

Discography

P-    Production, 
E-    Engineering,
M-   Mixing, 
Pr-   Programming, 
Gtr- Guitar, 
Co-W-  Co-Writing

American record producers
Living people
Year of birth missing (living people)